Sweden has a fairly limited system of motorways (motorväg in Swedish). The first motorway (Malmö–Lund) was opened in 1953. The motorways' primary purpose is connecting major cities to their surrounding areas, although there is a long-term ambition to connect Stockholm, Gothenburg and Malmö with motorways.

With the completion of a couple of new motorway stretches in 2006 - 2015 an interconnecting motorway network exists from Öresund Bridge (to Denmark) to the Swedish- Norwegian border and to Gävle north of Stockholm.

There are also a number of motortrafikleder (semi-motorways, autostrasse), roads with only 2 or 3 (2+1) lanes but to which the same conditions apply as to motorways (i.e. grade-separated crossings, no slow traffic). These can be converted to motorways by adding a parallel road.

This is a complete listing of motorways in Sweden. The Swedish road numbering scheme does not distinguish between motorways and other types of roads.

The speed limit on motorways is generally 110 or 120 km/h (68 or 75 mph). Speed limits of 70 and 90 km/h are often used on urban motorways, and electronic signs can show a lower limit in bad weather.

List of current motorways

E4 Helsingborg – Kånna (south of Ljungby)
Kånna – Toftaholm is a 2+1 semi-motorway
Toftaholm (north of Ljungby) – Jönköping – Linköping – Norrköping – Stockholm – Uppsala – Gävle
Gävle – Bergby is a 2+1 semi-motorway
Söderhamn – Hudiksvall is a 2+2 road but signed as a semi-motorway
Njurunda - Sundsvall – Bergeforsen 
Piteå – Norrfjärden 
E6 (car ferries from Travemunde, Rostock, Sassitz and Świnoujście) outside Trelleborg with its large ferry harbour around Maglarp – Malmö – Halmstad – Gothenburg – Uddevalla – Svinesund – (Norway)
E18 Segmon – Ed 
Karlstad – Skattkärr
Lekhyttan – Örebro – Köping 
Köping – Västerås is a 2+1 semi-motorway
Västerås – Järva krog 
Bergshamra – Rosenkälla 
Rosenkälla – Söderhall is a 2+1 semi-motorway
Söderhall – Norrtälje 
E20 (Denmark) – Öresund Bridge – Malmö – Halmstad – Gothenburg – Tollered
Ingared - Alingsås
Lundsbrunn - Holmestad
Vretstorp – Arboga
Eskilstuna – Strängnäs – Stockholm
E22 Maglarp – Malmö – Lund – Fogdarp
Hörby – Fjälkinge
Gualöv – Mörrum
Nättraby – Karlskrona
Kalmar 
E45 Together with E18 Segmon – Ed, Sweden
 Surte – Göta
 Lilla Edet – Trollhättan
E65 Malmö – Tittente 
11 Malmö Bulltofta – Trafikplats-Sunnanå 
25 and 30 Öjaby – Växjö center 
28 Karlskrona Österleden
34 Linköping Trafikplats Tift (E4 Linköping västra) – Vallarondellen "Malmslättsleden"
35 Linköping Trafikplats Staby (E4 Linköping östra) – Mörtlösarondellen
40 Gothenburg – Borås – Ulricehamn
Through Haga in Jönköping 
44 Herrestad near Uddevalla – east parts of Uddevalla (old E6)
Råsseröd east of Uddevalla – Väne-Ryr (extension to road 45 opened during 2006)
49 Skara - Axvall
50 Together with E20 Brändåsen (Hallsberg) – Norrplan (Örebro)
53 Oxelösund – Nyköping 
73 Älgesta – Stockholm
75 Stockholm Södra länken
80 Gävle – Sandviken
222 Henriksdal – Graninge
226 Årsta – Östberga
229 Skarpnäck – Bollmora
260 Älta – Skrubba
265 Norrortsleden E4 – Sollentuna
273 E4 – Arlanda airport

Motorways without numbers
The numbers of these roads belong to secondary categories, that do not appear on signs and regular maps:
North of Helsingborg
Inre Ringvägen in Malmö, former E6/E20
Out of Malmö to E22 
Out of Malmö to E6/E22
"Saltsjöbadsleden" in Nacka

Note that there are more semi-motorways in Sweden, but they have not been considered interesting, since those do not connect to motorways.

Long-term goals 
There are long-term goals in the standard of the major roads, and all new constructed roads should follow this target standard. This target has varied over the years, therefore roads varies somewhat randomly in standard. A bad road has been rebuilt to the target standard of the time, while better roads have been kept as is, even though they didn't fulfill the target standard. This is especially noticeable on the E18.

E4
Helsingborg-Gävle: motorway
Gävle-Härnösand: probably narrower motorway all the way. The Enånger-Hudiksvall is being built as a dual carriageway, originally planned as a semi-motorway. The existing semi-motorways will be kept.
Härnösand-Haparanda: semi-motorway, motorways or dual carriageways close to the cities.
E6
motorway all the way, finished in 2015.
E18
Segmon-Norrtälje: motorway all the way. Norway-Segmon: semi-motorwaylike with some crossings in level.
E20
Gothenburg-Vårgårda: motorway 
Vårgårda-Vretstorp: either motorway or semi-motorway.
Vretstorp-Stockholm: motorway
E22
Trelleborg-Karlskrona: motorway. The existing semi-motorways within Blekinge will be kept, but those within Skåne are planned to be rebuilt.
Karlskrona-Söderköping: 2+1 semi-motorway, but it will take long time before it is built.
Söderköping-Norrköping: motorway
40
Gothenburg-Ulricehamn: motorway
Ulricehamn-Jönköping: semi-motorway

Gallery

See also 
Transportation in Sweden
List of controlled-access highway systems
Evolution of motorway construction in European nations

External links 

Motorways

Sweden
Motorways
Motorways